Moonrise is a 1948 American film noir crime film directed by Frank Borzage starring Dane Clark, Gail Russell and Ethel Barrymore. It is based on the 1946 novel of the same name by Theodore Strauss. The plot concerns the son of a man who was hanged for murder, leading to his own bullying and subsequent trials when he commits a crime in self-defense.

Plot 
In a small Virginia town, Danny Hawkins (Dane Clark) is the son of a murderer who was hanged for his crime. Throughout his childhood, he is haunted by his father's past and cruelly harassed by other children. As an adult, Danny is bullied by Jerry Sykes (Lloyd Bridges). After a particularly intense confrontation in the woods during a town dance, Danny and Jerry fight and Danny kills him in self-defense. Danny is unaware that he lost his pocket knife in the struggle. Danny then dances with Gilly Johnson (Gail Russell), who was to be engaged to Jerry. While driving Gilly and two of their friends, Danny struggles with his guilt, and drives recklessly in the rain, crashing.

Gilly finds herself responding warmly to Danny's advances, even as she puzzles over Jerry's disappearance. After a few days, the body is found, and Sheriff Clem Otis (Allyn Joslyn) starts closing in on the culprit. Thinking the sheriff has placed the blame on someone else, Danny goes to the fair with Gilly, but panics when Otis appears and seems to discover his guilt. The harmless mute Billy Scripture (Harry Morgan) shows Danny that he has found his pocket knife, leading Danny to nearly strangle him. After hiding out at the swampy residence of the wise Mose Jackson, Danny visits his grandmother (Barrymore), who reveals that his father was in Danny's same remorseful position after his crime. Danny realizes he is not tainted by "bad blood" and turns himself in, giving him a more optimistic future.

Cast

Production 
In December 1945, Paramount Pictures purchased the rights to adapt Theodore Strauss's yet-to-be-released novel, which was serialized by Cosmopolitan in August and September 1946, and published as a book that October. Two independent producers purchased the film rights from Paramount, and reportedly spent $40,000 on advertising for the novel. The duo was unable to secure a completion bond, and were sued by William Wellman, whom they had hired as the film's director.

The film was ultimately made by Republic Pictures with Frank Borzage as director. It was a relatively high-budget film compared to Republic's Westerns, which usually cost around $50,000.

Reception
The film flopped at the box office. The New York Times wrote that "the book towers above the picture" despite the latter's fidelity to the source.

Accolades
Nomination: Moonrise received an Oscar nomination for Best Sound Recording (Daniel J. Bloomberg) in 1948.

Home media
Moonrise was released on DVD and Blu-ray by The Criterion Collection on May 8, 2018.

See also
 List of American films of 1948

References

External links
 
 
 
 
 

1948 films
1948 crime drama films
American black-and-white films
American crime drama films
Film noir
Films based on American novels
Films directed by Frank Borzage
Films scored by William Lava
Films set in Virginia
Republic Pictures films
Southern Gothic films
1940s English-language films
1940s American films